Hatchet is an American slasher film series created by Adam Green, which currently consists of four films, with a fifth one rumored to be in development. The series primarily focuses on the living urban legend of deformed black hermit Victor Crowley (portrayed by white actor Kane Hodder under heavy makeup), as well as his extremely violent kills.

The series consists of four films, starting with Hatchet and followed by three sequels, Hatchet II and Hatchet III, and Victor Crowley. A fifth film has been teased by Green, which would leave behind the usual setting of Honey Island Swamp and instead go for a more suburban setting. The series features multiple appearances by slasher villain actors, including: Kane Hodder (Jason Voorhees), Robert Englund (Freddy Krueger), Tony Todd (Candyman), Sid Haig (House of 1000 Corpses), R. A. Mihailoff (Leatherface), Derek Mears (Jason Voorhees in the 2009 reboot), Tyler Mane (Michael Myers in the 2007 remake) and Felissa Rose (Angela Baker).

Films

Hatchet (2006)

When a group of tourists in a New Orleans haunted swamp tour find themselves stranded in the wilderness, their evening of fun and spooks turns into a horrific nightmare.

Hatchet II (2010)

Hatchet III (2013)

Victor Crowley (2017)

Cast and crew
Many characters have played a part in the Hatchet series, most of which only having one-off appearances, but some protagonists such as Marybeth Dunston and Andrew Yong have been featured in multiple films, with Victor Crowley appearing in every film so far in the series.

Cast
 This table shows the recurring characters and the actors who have portrayed them throughout the series.
 A dark grey cell indicates the character was not in the film, or that the character's presence in the film has not yet been announced.
 A  indicates a cameo appearance.

Reception

Box office performance

Other media

Related film

In Hatchet II, released seven months after Adam Green's Frozen, Emma Bell appears in an uncredited cameo reprising her role as Parker O'Neal (the protagonist of Frozen), in a scene serving as an epilogue to the main events of Frozen. In the scene, Parker is revealed to have successfully sued the ski resort for abandoning her, Dan, and Joe to the wolves, declaring that she will never go skiing again.

Comic books
In 2017, after four feature films, series creator Adam Green would green-light Adam Green's Hatchet (2017)—a four-issue comic book retelling of the 2006 film published by American Mythology. The issues were written by James Kuhoric and illustrated by Andrew Mangum. American Mythology would follow this with an original limited edition Hatchet saga, Hatchet: Vengeance—which follows Victor Crowley facing off against another monster inhabiting the fictitious Honey Island Swamp. On October 9th, 2019, the anthological three-issue limited series Victor Crowley's Hatchet Halloween Tales was released, issue one written by Jason Pell, two by SA Check, and three by James Kuhoric. Halloween Tales would be expanded with the anthological Halloween Tales II in September 2020—again a three-issue limited series. Green makes his comic writing debut with the first issue that focuses on three witches trespassing Crowley's lair, while previous writers Pell and Kuhoric return to write the second and third issues, respectively. July 2021 featured the release of the one-shot comic Adam Green's Hatchet: Unstoppable Horror. In October of that year, Halloween Tales continued with Halloween Tales III.

References

External links
 
 
 
 

 
Horror film series
Film series introduced in 2006